Will Hindmarch is a game designer who has worked primarily on role-playing games.

Career
Atlas Games brought on Will Hindmarch as a new employee following the success of their d20 lines. Atlas published a few final d20 products in 2004 and when they cancelled the rest of their d20 line, Hindmarch left Atlas. A new Vampire product line edited by Hindmarch for White Wolf followed soon after the release of Vampire: The Requiem (2004). The first product to use the Storytelling Adventure System was Hindmarch's The Resurrectionists (2007) for Vampire: The Requiem. Hindmarch and Jeff Tidball formed a new small press called Gameplaywright.

References

External links
 

Atlas Games people
Living people
Role-playing game designers
White Wolf game designers
Year of birth missing (living people)